Marouan Laghnej (born April 22, 1986) is a Tunisian basketball player, currently playing for JS Kairouan of the Tunisian Championnat National A.  He is also a former member of the Tunisian national basketball team.

Slimane is a member of the Tunisia national basketball team.  He competed at the 2007 FIBA Africa Championship and as a junior in the 2004 FIBA Africa Under-20 Championship. Left off the roster for the FIBA Africa Championship 2009, he replaced Marouen Lahmar for the 2010 World Championship.  He was part of Tunisia's team at the 2012 Summer Olympics.

References

External links

Tunisian men's basketball players
1986 births
Living people
Basketball players at the 2012 Summer Olympics
Olympic basketball players of Tunisia
Point guards
Shooting guards
US Monastir basketball players
JS Kairouan basketball players
People from Kairouan
2010 FIBA World Championship players
20th-century Tunisian people
21st-century Tunisian people